CB Milton, aka Clarence Bekker (born Clarence Becker Milton, 11 April 1968, in Suriname), is a Dutch electronic music vocalist, who became known in the early 1990s. He is best known for the singles "It's a Loving Thing", "Send Me an Angel" and "Open Your Heart". In the UK Singles Chart, "It's a Loving Thing" reached No. 34 in a remixed version in March 1995, and "Hold On (If You Believe in Love)" peaked at No. 62 in August that year. He also recorded three albums, It's My Loving Thing (1994), The Way to Wonderland (1996) and From Here to There (1998) for the Byte Records label in Antwerp, Belgium.

CB Milton was identified as Clarence Bekker of the Netherlands on the disc and DVD created by Playing for Change released in April 2009. He participated with various other artists on the songs "Stand by Me" (Ben E. King) and "Don't Worry" (Pierre Minetti) on the album. He is also part of the Playing for Change band, brought together to promote the disc.

Clarence performed at the Dutch 5 May Concert in Amsterdam.

Discography

Singles

Collaborations

Albums

References

External links
Clarence Bekker official website
Discogs.com biography
Bekker's page on the Playing for Change site

1968 births
Living people
Dutch dance musicians
21st-century Dutch male singers
21st-century Dutch singers
20th-century Surinamese male singers
Surinamese emigrants to the Netherlands